Chemical Entities of Biological Interest, also known as ChEBI, is a chemical database and ontology of molecular entities focused on 'small' chemical compounds, that is part of the Open Biomedical Ontologies (OBO) effort at the European Bioinformatics Institute (EBI). The term "molecular entity" refers to any "constitutionally or isotopically distinct atom, molecule, ion, ion pair, radical, radical ion, complex, conformer, etc., identifiable as a separately distinguishable entity". The molecular entities in question are either products of nature or synthetic products which have potential bioactivity. Molecules directly encoded by the genome, such as nucleic acids, proteins and peptides derived from proteins by proteolytic cleavage, are not as a rule included in ChEBI.

ChEBI uses nomenclature, symbolism and terminology endorsed by the International Union of Pure and Applied Chemistry (IUPAC) and nomenclature committee of the International Union of Biochemistry and Molecular Biology (NC-IUBMB).

Scope and access 
All data in the database is non-proprietary or is derived from a non-proprietary source. It is thus freely accessible and available to anyone. In addition, each data item is fully traceable and explicitly referenced to the original source. It is related in scope other databases such as ChEMBL, ChemSpider, DrugBank, MetaboLights and PubChem.

ChEBI data is available through a public web application, web services, SPARQL endpoint and downloads.

References 

Biological databases
Chemical databases
Chemical nomenclature
Science and technology in Cambridgeshire
South Cambridgeshire District